Hamodes is a genus of moths of the family Erebidae. The genus was erected by Achille Guenée in 1852.

Species
 Hamodes butleri (Leech, 1900)
 Hamodes crebrerrima Snellen, 1877
 Hamodes lutea (Walker, 1863)
 Hamodes pallida Felder, 1861
 Hamodes pendleburyi Prout, 1932
 Hamodes propitia Boisduval, 1832
 Hamodes simplicia Weymer, 1892
 Hamodes unilinea Swinhoe, 1890

References

Calpinae